Metello Bichi (1541–1619) was a Roman Catholic cardinal.

Biography
On 18 Feb 1596, he was consecrated bishop by Alessandro Ottaviano de' Medici, Archbishop of Florence, with Matteo Sanminiato, Archbishop of Chieti, and Cristóbal Robuster y Senmanat, Bishop Emeritus of Orihuela, serving as co-consecrators.

Episcopal succession

References

1541 births
1619 deaths
17th-century Italian cardinals
17th-century Italian Roman Catholic archbishops